Cherylene Alice Lee (June 13, 1953 – March 18, 2016) was an American actress and writer.

Life 
Lee was born and raised in Los Angeles, and was a fourth-generation Chinese-American. She had two sisters, Priscilla "Puggy" and Virginia. She began a career as a child actress and dancer at age three, and performed in a song and dance team with her sister Virginia in Las Vegas for three summers. She graduated from UC Berkeley with a BA in Paleontology and from UCLA with an MS in Geology. She subsequently managed an alternative wastewater treatment plant as a Disney Imagineer. In 1977, she returned to the stage, performing in A Chorus Line.In 1983, she began writing plays, poetry, and fiction. Her plays include The Legacy Codes about the Wen Ho Lee affair and Carry the Tiger to the Mountain about the death of Vincent Chin.

In 2015, Lee self-published an autobiography, "Just Like Really": An Uncommon Chinese American Memoir. On March 18, 2016, Lee died in her sleep with her two sisters at her side, after a long battle with breast cancer.

References

External links 
cherylenelee.com
"Just Like Really": An Uncommon Chinese American Memoir by Cherylene Lee
Article by Cherylene Lee about her plays
Guide to Lee's plays

1953 births
2016 deaths
American actresses of Chinese descent
American film actresses
American writers of Chinese descent
Actresses from Los Angeles
Deaths from breast cancer
20th-century American actresses
20th-century American dramatists and playwrights
20th-century American women writers
21st-century American dramatists and playwrights
21st-century American women writers
American women memoirists
21st-century American memoirists
American women dramatists and playwrights
Writers from Los Angeles